Kriete Corner is an unincorporated community in Jackson Township, Jackson County, Indiana, United States.

The community was named for a family who kept a store.

Geography

References

Unincorporated communities in Jackson County, Indiana
Unincorporated communities in Indiana